"Das zerbrochene Ringlein" (The broken little ring) is a poem by Joseph von Eichendorff, published under the title "Lied" (lay, or song) in 1813 by Justinus Kerner et al. in the almanac Deutscher Dichterwald (German Poets' Forest) under the pseudonym "Florens". The poem appears under Eichendorff's name in his first novel , written in 1812 and published in 1815. It is also known by its first line, "In einem kühlen Grunde" (In a cool valley).

 set Eichendorf's poem to music under the title "Untreue" (Infidelity).

The song has been recorded by many artists.

Text

Melody

The song as published by Friedrich Glück.

References

External links 
 
 

German poems
1813 poems
Volkslied
Works by Joseph von Eichendorff